Gangster Payday (大茶飯) is a 2014 Hong Kong action comedy drama film directed by Lee Po-cheung. It was the closing film at the 19th Busan International Film Festival. It was released on 6 November.

Cast
Anthony Wong
Charlene Choi
Wong You-nam
Michael Chan
Ng Chi-hung
Philip Keung
Deep Ng
Wilson Tsui
Joe Cheung
Carrie Ng
Arthur Wong
Law Wing-cheung

References

External links
 

2010s action comedy-drama films
Hong Kong action comedy-drama films
2014 films
2010s Hong Kong films